Showtime is a Croatian show similar to Pop Idol. The show started in the fall of summer 2007 when auditions were held in Osijek, Rijeka, Split and Zagreb. Out of more than 1,000 auditioners, 200 made it through to the next round, in which the judges picked the Top 22. All of the semi-finalists were called to Zagreb for the Piano Round, in which the judges decided on the Top 16 - 8 male and 8 female contestants. The format in the finals was as following: All of the contestants would perform, the judges would give their marks (1-5, 5 being the best) to each contestant and then the judges' marks would combine with public vote giving two contestants (always 1 male and 1 female) who pulled in the lowest overall score and who had to leave the competition. This format was used all the way to Top 6, when only contestant left the show. The following week, Top 5, one more contestant left the show, leaving 4 finalists who competed in the 4-way Finale. 16-year-old Franka Batelić won the competition.

Hosts

Mia Kovačić
Ivan Vukušić

Judges

Jacques Houdek
Ivana Husar
Boris Banović aka Fashion Guru

Episode summaries

Top 22 - Piano Round

Airdate: October 27, 2007

Cut: Daria Karić, Dario Stojanović, Igor Cukrov, Jelena Duvnjak, Katarina Grujo1, Maksim Hozić

1 Originally made it through, but had to drop out due to school schedule.

Top 16 - Free Choice

Airdate: November 3, 2007

Bottom four: Mario Sambrailo, Ivo Marinković, Daniella Eva Sanković, Kristina Petravić
Eliminated: Ivo Marinković and Daniella Eva Sanković

Top 14 - Free Choice

Airdate: November 10, 2007

Bottom four: Jelena Kapitanović, Mijo Lešina, Anita Španec, Valter Ilić
Eliminated: Valter Ilić and Jelena Kapitanović

Top 12 - Free Choice

Airdate: November 17, 2007

Bottom four: Dario Jerković, Miro Tomić, Franka Batelić, Valentina Trupinović
Eliminated: Dario Jerković and Valentina Trupinović

Top 10 - Own Songs2

Airdate: November 24, 2007

Bottom four: Kristina Petravić, Filip Dizdar, Miro Tomić, Anita Španec
Eliminated: Kristina Petravić and Miro Tomić

2 Contestants got to work with five producers, who wrote songs just for them. Each song was given to two contestants, 1 male and 1 female, and they sang it each week either until the finale or their elimination.

Top 8 - Producer's Choice/3

Airdate: December 1, 2007

Bottom four: Iva Ajduković, Filip Dizdar, Anita Španec, Mario Ponjavić
Eliminated: Anita Španec and Filip Dizdar

3 Contestants also sang their own songs, just like the week before.

Top 6 - Duets/3

Airdate: December 8, 2007

Eliminated: Mario Sambrailo

3 Contestants also sang their own songs, just like the week before.

Top 5 - Atypical/3

Airdate: December 15, 2007

Eliminated: Iva Ajduković

3 Contestants also sang their own songs, just like the week before.

Top 4 - Finale

Airdate: December 22, 2007

Contestants also sang their own songs, just like the week before.

Winner: Franka Batelić

Elimination chart

 Bottom 4 doesn't mean the contestant was actually in the real bottom 4. During Top 8 Results, Mia, the host, even said "that two of the contestants standing on the centre stage are going home and the other two have been picked randomly".

Croatian reality television series
2007 Croatian television series debuts
2007 Croatian television series endings
2000s Croatian television series
2000s game shows
Croatian game shows
Nova TV (Croatia) original programming